The 2017 CAF Confederation Cup Final was the final of the 2017 CAF Confederation Cup, the 14th edition of the CAF Confederation Cup, Africa's secondary club football competition organized by the Confederation of African Football (CAF).

The final was contested in two-legged home-and-away format between TP Mazembe of the Democratic Republic of the Congo and SuperSport United of South Africa. The first leg was hosted by TP Mazembe at the Stade TP Mazembe in Lubumbashi on 19 November 2017, while the second leg was hosted by SuperSport United at the Lucas Masterpieces Moripe Stadium in Pretoria on 25 November 2017. The winner earned the right to play in the 2018 CAF Super Cup against the winner of the 2017 CAF Champions League.

TP Mazembe defeated SuperSport United 2–1 in the first leg, and with the second leg ending in a 0–0 draw, won 2–1 on aggregate to be crowned CAF Confederation Cup champions for the second consecutive year.

Teams

Venues
Stade TP Mazembe in Lubumbashi, Democratic Republic of the Congo, hosted the first leg, while Lucas Masterpieces Moripe Stadium in Pretoria, South Africa, hosted the second leg.

Road to the final

Note: In all results below, the score of the finalist is given first (H: home; A: away).

Format
The final was played on a home-and-away two-legged basis, with the order of legs decided by an additional draw held after the group stage draw, which was held on 26 April 2017. If the aggregate score was tied after the second leg, the away goals rule would be applied, and if still tied, extra time would not be played, and the penalty shoot-out would be used to determine the winner (Regulations III. 26 & 27).

Matches

First leg

Second leg

See also
2017 CAF Champions League Final
2018 CAF Super Cup

References

External links
Total Confederation Cup 2017, CAFonline.com

2017
Final
CCC
CCC
November 2017 sports events in Africa
International club association football competitions hosted by the Democratic Republic of the Congo